Four Seasons of Morita Village is the fifth album recorded by the Toshiko Akiyoshi Jazz Orchestra featuring Lew Tabackin.  It was released in 1996 and won the Swing Journal Silver Disk Award for that year.  The central "Four Seasons of Morita Village Suite" was commissioned by Morita Village in Aomori Prefecture, Japan.  This recording is not to be confused with the 1990 (Nippon Crown) Toshiko Akiyoshi Trio recording, Four Seasons.

Track listing
All songs composed and arranged by Toshiko Akiyoshi:
"Dance of the Gremlins" – 7:48    
 "Repose" – 7:21    
 "Pollination" – 12:16  
 "Norito" – 6:40  
 "Harvest Shuffle" – 7:59  
"Retro Zone" – 10:39  
"China Remembered" – 5:44

"Repose", "Pollination", "Norito" and "Harvest Shuffle" make up the four part "Four Seasons of Morita Village Suite"

Personnel
Toshiko Akiyoshi – piano  
Lew Tabackin – tenor saxophone, flute   
Walt Weiskopf – tenor saxophone, flute, clarinet    
Dave Pietro – alto saxophone, flute, clarinet    
Jim Snidero – alto saxophone, flute  
Scott Robinson – baritone saxophone, bass clarinet    
Mike Ponella – trumpet   
John Eckert – trumpet  
Andy Gravish – trumpet  
Joe Magnarelli – trumpet
Scott Whitfield – trombone  
Pat Hallaran – trombone  
Joel Helleny – trombone  
Tim Newman – bass trombone  
Doug Weiss – bass  
Terry Clarke – drums  
Other  
Kenichi Nagamine – tsugaru shamisen

References / External Links

BMG Novus J BVCJ-638  
[ Allmusic]

Toshiko Akiyoshi – Lew Tabackin Big Band albums
1996 albums